The Smiling, Proud Wanderer is a wuxia novel by Jin Yong (Louis Cha). It was first serialised in Hong Kong in the newspaper Ming Pao from 20 April 1967 to 12 October 1969. The Chinese title of the novel, Xiao Ao Jiang Hu, literally means to live a carefree life in a mundane world of strife. Alternate English translations of the title include The Wandering Swordsman, Laughing in the Wind, The Peerless Gallant Errant, and The Proud and Gallant Wanderer. Another alternative title, State of Divinity, is used for some of the novel's adaptations.

Plot
In the jianghu (martial artists' community), there is a highly coveted martial arts manual known as the "Bixie Swordplay Manual", which is the heirloom of the Lin family who runs the Fuwei Security Service in Fuzhou. The Qingcheng School's leader, Yu Canghai, leads his followers to massacre the Lins and attempts to seize the manual but does not find it. Yue Buqun, the leader of the Mount Hua School, — a member of the "orthodox" Five Mountains Sword Schools Alliance — saves Lin Pingzhi, the Lin family's sole survivor, accepts him as an apprentice and trains him in swordplay.

The novel's protagonist is Yue Buqun's most senior apprentice, Linghu Chong, an orphaned, happy-go-lucky but honourable swordsman who has a penchant for alcoholic drinks. He befriends the notorious bandit Tian Boguang and saves Yilin, a nun from the (North) Mount Heng School, from Tian's lecherous advances. In the meantime, Liu Zhengfeng of the (South) Mount Heng School announces his decision to leave the jianghu and invites his fellow martial artists to witness his retirement ceremony. The event turns into a bloodbath when Zuo Lengchan, the chief of the Mount Song School, and other "orthodox" schools accuse Liu Zhengfeng of being unfaithful to their alliance by befriending Qu Yang, an elder of the "evil" Sun Moon Holy Cult. Liu Zhengfeng and Qu Yang are cornered by Zuo Lengchan and his men and eventually commit suicide. Before dying, Liu Zhengfeng and Qu Yang give Linghu Chong the score of "Xiaoao Jianghu" ("Laughing Proudly in the Jianghu"), a musical piece they composed together. (The Chinese title of the novel comes from the name of this fictional musical piece.)

Lin Pingzhi's entrance into the Mount Hua School causes Linghu Chong's romantic feelings for Yue Lingshan, Yue Buqun's daughter, to subside because she starts falling in love with Lin Pingzhi. At the same time, Linghu Chong's friendship with Tian Boguang leads him into trouble as it is against the Mount Hua School's rules to associate oneself with any jianghu lowlife or person from an "evil" school. His master punishes him by making him stay alone for a year in a secluded area on Mount Hua to reflect on his "misdeeds". During this time, he discovers carvings of swordplay techniques in a cave, practises them, and unknowingly familiarises himself with the skills of the other four sword schools and the counter-moves. He also encounters Feng Qingyang, a reclusive Mount Hua School swordsman, who teaches him the powerful skill Nine Swords of Dugu.

The self-proclaimed righteous Five Mountains Sword Schools Alliance, though seemingly united, is constantly troubled by politicking and infighting among its members. Linghu Chong gets entangled in the conflicts and sustains serious internal injuries while using his newly mastered skill to defend his Mount Hua School fellows from attacks by Mount Song School members in disguise. The other schools mistake the Nine Swords of Dugu for the Bixie Swordplay, and wrongly accuse Linghu Chong of stealing the "Bixie Swordplay Manual" and keeping it for himself. Yue Buqun also becomes suspicious and secretly jealous of his apprentice's sudden leap in swordplay prowess.

While accompanying his master and Mount Hua School fellows on a trip to Luoyang, Linghu Chong encounters Ren Yingying, a key figure of the Sun Moon Holy Cult and falls in love with her. He also meets several jianghu lowlifes, who are friendly towards him and try to heal him. By then, Yue Buqun has grown tired of Linghu Chong's association with jianghu lowlifes so he abandons his apprentice. Linghu Chong also helps Ren Yingying fend off enemies of the Sun Moon Holy Cult and his injuries worsen over time. Eventually, she brings him to the Shaolin School to seek help. Linghu Chong later learns from Fangzheng, the Shaolin abbot, that Yue Buqun has publicly announced that he has expelled Linghu Chong from the Mount Hua School.

Linghu Chong sinks into despair as he is now an outcast of the "orthodox" side of the jianghu. After leaving Shaolin, he meets a stranger, Xiang Wentian, whom he saves from dozens of enemies. Xiang Wentian becomes sworn brothers with Linghu Chong and brings him to a manor in Hangzhou, where they find Ren Woxing (Ren Yingying's father), the former leader of the Sun Moon Holy Cult who was ousted from power by his deputy, Dongfang Bubai. Ren Woxing breaks out of captivity by knocking out Linghu Chong and using him as a decoy. While trapped inside the dungeon, Linghu Chong discovers carvings of Ren Woxing's infamous Cosmic Absorbing Power and learns the skill by chance. Ren Woxing returns to save Linghu Chong later and tries to persuade him to join the Sun Moon Holy Cult by offering him Ren Yingying's hand in marriage. Linghu Chong declines to join, but still helps Ren Woxing defeat Dongfang Bubai and regain control of the cult.

Linghu Chong becomes the new head of the (North) Mount Heng School, whose members are all nuns, after he unsuccessfully tries to save its leaders from a masked assassin. He attends a special assembly of the Five Mountains Sword Schools Alliance called for by Zuo Lengchan, who attempts to coerce the other four schools into merging into the Mount Song School under his leadership. However, he is defeated and blinded by Yue Buqun, who uses the Bixie Swordplay against him. Yue Buqun becomes the new leader of the alliance.

After leaving the assembly, Linghu Chong and Ren Yingying see Lin Pingzhi brutally slaying members of the Qingcheng School to avenge his family, and overhear a conversation between him and his wife, Yue Lingshan. Lin Pingzhi reveals that both he and Yue Buqun have mastered the Bixie Swordplay, which is considered "unorthodox" because they need to castrate themselves to fulfill the prerequisite for learning it. Linghu Chong also learns that Yue Buqun, his respectable former master, is actually a villainous hypocrite who planned an elaborate scheme against Lin Pingzhi to seize the swordplay manual in the hope of dominating the jianghu. Lin Pingzhi then stabs Yue Lingshan to prove his loyalty to Zuo Lengchan, who is plotting revenge against Yue Buqun. Before Yue Lingshan dies, she makes Linghu Chong promise to spare Lin Pingzhi's life as she still loves him. Linghu Chong reluctantly agrees after considering his past romantic feelings for Yue Lingshan.

Yue Buqun schemes to kill Lin Pingzhi, who knows his secret, and seeks to silence him. Linghu Chong, despite his reluctance to be enemies with his former master, ultimately chooses to stop Yue Buqun and protect the innocent from his evil machinations. The finale climaxes with the members of the Five Mountains Sword Schools Alliance being trapped in the cave on Mount Hua owing to Yue Buqun's treachery. The schools slaughter each other out of paranoia and distrust, ultimately leading to the alliance's dissolution. Linghu Chong defeats Lin Pingzhi and spares his life as he had promised Yue Lingshan, but permanently disables Lin Pingzhi to prevent him from hurting others again. Meanwhile, Yue Buqun is killed by Yilin when he is fighting with Linghu Chong during the frenzy.

After the collapse of the alliance, Ren Woxing plans an attack on the scattered and fragmented "orthodox" schools in order to unite the jianghu under the control of his "evil" Sun Moon Holy Cult. He tries to force Linghu Chong to join him, but dies at a crucial moment from a stroke. Ren Yingying becomes the new leader of the Sun Moon Holy Cult and successfully negotiates a truce between the "orthodox" and "evil" sides of the jianghu. Three years later, she passes the leadership to Xiang Wentian and marries Linghu Chong and they live happily ever after.

Characters

Schools, clans and organisations

Five Mountain Sword Schools Alliance

Sun Moon Holy Cult
The Sun Moon Holy Cult is based on Black Woods Cliff (in present-day Xibaipo, Hebei). Its origin is unclear, Martial artists in the jianghu often refer to the Sun Moon Holy Cult as the "Demonic Cult", as they previously did to the Ming Cult. Considered eccentric and heretical, the cult is a common enemy of the orthodox schools. Its members are known for engaging in various types of cult-like activities and committing heinous crimes. It was led by Ren Woxing until Dongfang Bubai ousts the former from power in a scheme. Dongfang treats his followers cruelly, forcing them to consume poison pills and giving them antidotes to temporarily ease their agony only if they obey him. Ren Woxing practises the "Cosmic Absorbing Power", which allows him to drain and absorb an opponent's inner energy, while Dongfang Bubai is said to be invincible after he mastered the skills in the Sunflower Manual.

Others
 Qingcheng School
 Fuwei Security Service
 Shaolin School
 Wudang School

Themes
In the afterword, Jin Yong mentions that The Smiling, Proud Wanderer can be read as a political allegory disguised as a wuxia novel. As an allegory, it can happen in "any dynasty or organisation". Jin Yong also stated in the afterword that after the novel was published, Vietnamese politicians had once used the names of Yue Buqun and Zuo Lengchan as derogatory terms against one another in parliamentary sessions.

Adaptations

Films

Television

Comics
A total of 26 volumes of the manhua series by Lee Chi Ching, titled State of Divinity, were published by Ming Ho in Hong Kong and M&C (Gramedia Group) in Indonesia.

Stage productions
In 2006, the Hong Kong Dance Company adapted the novel into a stage play, starring Rosanne Wong, Race Wong, Liu Yinghong, Su Shu, Chen Lei and Mi Tao, as a jubilee presentation to celebrate the company's 25th anniversary.

In 2010, the Yangtze Repertory Theatre of America presented the premiere of Laughing in the Wind: A Cautionary Tale in Martial Arts in New York City. The play was adapted and directed by Joanna Chan and featured 18 actors playing 26 roles.

Video games
 From 2000 to 2002, Interserv International Inc. published three games adapted from the novel using a 3D engine.
 Swordsman Online is a MMORPG developed by Perfect World. The game also features additional schools that do not appear in the novel.
 Linghu Chong was a playable character in the 2008 PC fighting game Street Fighter Online: Mouse Generation.

References

 
1967 novels
20th-century Chinese novels
Novels first published in serial form
Works originally published in Ming Pao
Novels about orphans
Novels set in Imperial China
Chinese novels adapted into television series
Chinese novels adapted into films
Self-harm in fiction
Novels set in Shaanxi
Novels set in Hunan
Novels set in Shandong
Novels set in Shanxi